Chris Shula (born February 5, 1986) is an American football coach who is the pass rush coordinator and linebackers coach for the Los Angeles Rams of the National Football League (NFL).

Family
Chris is the son of former Cincinnati Bengals head coach Dave Shula and current defensive backs coach for the Los Angeles Rams. He is also the grandson of the late Hall of Fame coach Don Shula. His uncle Mike Shula was the former head coach at Alabama (the last before Nick Saban's hiring in 2007) and is currently Senior Offensive Assistant for the Buffalo Bills.

Playing career
Shula played linebacker for the Miami RedHawks from 2004 until 2008 where he was teammates with Sean McVay.

Coaching career
Shula was promoted to linebackers coach with the Los Angeles Rams on February 23, 2021. Shula became a Super Bowl champion when the Rams defeated the Cincinnati Bengals in Super Bowl LVI.

References

1986 births
Living people
Players of American football from Miami
American football linebackers
Miami RedHawks football players
Coaches of American football from Florida
Ball State Cardinals football coaches
Indiana Hoosiers football coaches
John Carroll Blue Streaks football coaches
San Diego Chargers coaches
Los Angeles Rams coaches